Hamidou Bojang (born 1 January 1997) is a Gambian international footballer who plays for ASC Linguère, as a defender.

Career
Born in Brikama, he has played club football for Brikama United and ASC Linguère.

He made his international debut for Gambia in 2016.

References

1997 births
Living people
Gambian footballers
The Gambia international footballers
Brikama United FC players
ASC Linguère players
Association football defenders
Gambian expatriate footballers
Gambian expatriate sportspeople in Senegal
Expatriate footballers in Senegal